Raiffeisen Bank (formerly Raiffeisen Bank Aval) is a commercial bank in Ukraine. It was registered on March 27, 1992, and since 2006 is a subsidiary of Austrian Raiffeisen Bank International. In 2015 the European Bank for Reconstruction and Development acquired a 30% stake in Raiffeisen Bank Aval, increasing its capital. Raiffeisen Bank International has a stake of 68.26% in the bank.

As of 2018 the fourth-largest bank in the country and the largest bank with foreign capital. Following a government bailout of the country's largest bank at the turn of 2016 and 2017, Raiffeisen Bank Aval was the only bank in the top 5 not owned by the government of Ukraine.

In June 2021 the bank changed its name from “Raiffeisen Bank Aval” officially to “Raiffeisen Bank”.

It was headed from 2005 till 2019 by Volodymyr Lavrenchuk.

As of January 1, 2018, the bank's net assets amounted to more than UAH 72 billion, and in terms of their size. Raiffeisen ranks third in the retail banking market. 

At the beginning of 2018, the bank's service network included 503 branches, 2525 ATMs and 414 payment terminals . The bank has issued 4.9 million payment cards , Raiffeisen Bank also owns one of the largest networks of trading POS terminals with more than 23,000 units.

Banking network 

At the end of 2013, the national network included 798 operating units:

 711 full-featured branches providing a full list of standard banking services to individuals and clients of microbusiness, small, medium and corporate businesses;
85 commission branches serving private clients, carrying out cash transactions;
2 branches serving VIP-clients.
The vast majority of Raiffeisen Bank Aval's branches are fully functional, i.e. they provide a full range of standard banking services to private and corporate clients, as well as small and micro businesses. In addition, the bank's network includes commission branches on the territory of the State Customs Service of Ukraine and in representative offices / stores of MTS Ukraine, the bank's corporate client.

See also 

List of banks in Ukraine

References

External links
  
Facebook

Banks of Ukraine
Ukrainian companies established in 1992
Banks established in 1992
Companies based in Kyiv
Raiffeisen Zentralbank
European Bank for Reconstruction and Development joint ventures